The Crown Complex (originally the Cumberland County Crown Coliseum) is a multi-purpose venue in Fayetteville, North Carolina that includes the Crown Coliseum, an indoor stadium. The stadium broke ground in 1995 and opened in 1997, and is currently home to the Fayetteville Marksmen ice hockey team. The Coliseum replaced the Crown Arena in the same complex as the main venue for sports events.

The complex also contains a 2,400-seat auditorium named the Crown Theater and a 4,500-seat venue named Crown Arena, both of which were built in the 1960s. On January 22, 2020, Cumberland County's commissioner announced that the Crown Arena and Crown Theater would close in October 2022 due to the venues' non-compliance with the ADA, but would not affect the Coliseum. The closing was pushed back to November 2025.

During the early stages of its construction, Crown Coliseum was mentioned as a possible temporary home for the NHL's Carolina Hurricanes, but this was blocked by minor league hockey executive Bill Coffey who had signed an exclusive lease agreement with the arena for the Fayetteville Force of the Central Hockey League.

It was reported in mid-January that TNA Wrestling would be taping its weekly TNA iMPACT! broadcast in the arena on February 24, 2011 — which would be only the second time in its history that the show would be broadcast outside Universal Studio's iMPACT! zone in Orlando, Florida. WWE taped its annual Tribute to the Troops show at the venue on December 11, 2011.

Fayetteville native rapper J. Cole's Forest Hills Drive: Live and his concert film, Forest Hills Drive: Homecoming was recorded at the arena on August 30, 2015, during his Forest Hills Drive Tour. Forest Hills Drive: Homecoming aired on HBO, January 9, 2016.

References

External links
 
 Crown Coliseum

Campbell Fighting Camels basketball
Indoor arenas in North Carolina
Basketball venues in North Carolina
Indoor ice hockey venues in the United States
Buildings and structures in Fayetteville, North Carolina
Defunct NBA G League venues
Fayetteville Patriots
Sports venues in Cumberland County, North Carolina
1997 establishments in North Carolina
Sports venues completed in 1997